This is a list of golfers who have won four or more events on the Korn Ferry Tour since it was established in 1990.

Many of the players on the list have won events on other tours and unofficial events.

Players under the age of 50 are shown in bold.

This list is up to date as of August 14, 2022.

See also
List of golfers to achieve a three-win promotion from the Korn Ferry Tour

References

Korn Ferry Tour
Web.com Tour
 
Web.com Tour